Videna is a genus of terrestrial pulmonate gastropod mollusks in the family Trochomorphidae. 

Members of this genus are found in Southeast Asia from India into South Korea, China, and into the Pacific islands. Videna have large, umbilicate, planispiral shells with the body of the snail visible through the shell.

Species
Species within the genus Videna include:
 Videna abbasi Thach, 2020
 Videna albocincta (L. Pfeiffer, 1846)
 Videna alticola (Möllendorff, 1894)
 Videna andamanica (Godwin-Austen, 1895)
 Videna boettgeri (Mollendorf, 1890)
 Videna boholensis (C. Semper, 1873)
 Videna cantoriana (Benson, 1861)
 Videna crassicarinata (Fulton, 1907)
 Videna crassula (Möllendorff, 1898)
 Videna electra (C. Semper, 1873)
 Videna frauenfeldi (L. Pfeiffer & Zelebor, 1867)
 Videna gracilis (Möllendorff, 1894)
 Videna grubaueri (Möllendorff, 1902)
 Videna infanda (C. Semper, 1873)
 Videna intermedia (Möllendorff, 1894)
 Videna iopharynx (Mörch, 1876)
 Videna kelantanensis (Möllendorff, 1902)
 Videna lardea (Martens, 1864)
 Videna metcalfii (L. Pfeiffer, 1845)
 Videna minahassae (P. Sarasin & F. Sarasin, 1899)
 Videna modesta (Fulton, 1907)
 Videna neglecta (Pilsbry, 1892)
 Videna niasensis (Fulton, 1907)
 Videna nitidella (Möllendorff, 1898)
 Videna oleacina
 Videna pagodula
 Videna pseudosanis (Fulton, 1897)
 Videna quadrasi (Hidalgo, 1890)
 Videna repanda (Möllendorff, 1890)
 Videna sanis (Benson, 1861)
 Videna schmackeri (Möllendorff, 1894)
 Videna sculpticarina (Martens, 1883)
 Videna sibuyanica (Hidalgo, 1887)
 Videna subnigritella (Beddome, 1891)
 Videna sulcipes (Mörch, 1872)
 Videna timorensis (Martens, 1867)
 Videna trilineata (Mörch, 1876)
Species brought into synonymy
 Videna planorbis (Lesson, 1831): synonym of Trochomorpha froggatti (Iredale, 1941) (based on unavailable original name (Helix planorbis Lesson, 1831 not Linnaeus, 1758))
 Videna pumila  H. B. Baker, 1941: synonym of Peleliua pumila (H. B. Baker, 1941) (original combination)

References

External links
 Zoological survey of India checklist
 Adams, H. & Adams, A. (1853-1858). The genera of Recent Mollusca; arranged according to their organization. London, van Voorst.
 Albers, J. C. (1850). Die Heliceen nach natürlicher Verwandtschaft systematisch geordnet. Berlin: Enslin. 262 pp

 
Gastropod genera
Taxonomy articles created by Polbot